Podilsk (or ), until May 2016 Kotovsk (Russian: Котовск) is a city in Odesa Oblast, southern Ukraine. Administratively, Podilsk serves as the administrative center of Podilsk Raion, one of seven districts of Odesa Oblast. It also hosts the administration of Podilsk urban hromada, one of the hromadas of Ukraine. 

In 2001, it had a population of 40,718. It is the largest city in the northern part of Odesa Oblast.

History
Birzula was first mentioned in Turkish documents in 1772 as one of the settlements of the Dubossar raya. The Russian-Italian physicist Gleb Wataghin was born in Birzula in 1899.

The city is known as the place where Soviet military leader Grigori Kotovsky was buried in a mausoleum. In 1935, the city was renamed Kotovsk after him; formerly the settlement bore the name Birzula. The mausoleum was later destroyed during the Romanian occupation of Transnistria. The monument was (again) dismantled in June 2017 to comply with decommunization laws.

A Vladimir Lenin statue in Kotovsk was pushed off its pedestal and broken into several pieces on December 9, 2013. On 21 May, 2016, Verkhovna Rada adopted decision to rename Kotovsk to Podilsk and Kotovsk Raion to Podilsk Raion according to the laws prohibiting names of Communist origin.

Until 18 July 2020, Podilsk was incorporated as a city of oblast significance and served as the administrative center of Podilsk Raion though it did not belong to the raion. In July 2020, as part of the administrative reform of Ukraine, which reduced the number of raions of Odesa Oblast to seven, the city of Podilsk was merged into Podilsk Raion.

Transportation 
The city has a major railway station and depot on the Odesa—Zhmerynka line (a stretch of the Razdelnaya—Poberezhye line).

Gallery

See also 

 List of cities in Ukraine

References

Cities in Odesa Oblast
Kherson Governorate
City name changes in Ukraine
Former Soviet toponymy in Ukraine
Cities in Podilsk Raion